Verrell is a surname. Notable people with the surname include:

Cec Verrell (born 1958), American actress
Ronnie Verrell (1926–2002), English jazz drummer